The 2006 Next Generation Adelaide International was an ATP tournament held in Adelaide, Australia. The tournament was held 2 – 8 January 2006.

Finals

Singles

 Florent Serra defeated  Xavier Malisse 6–3, 6–4

Doubles

 Jonathan Erlich /  Andy Ram defeated  Paul Hanley /  Kevin Ullyett, 7–6, 7–6

References

External links
 ITF tournament edition details

 
Next Generation Adelaide International
2000s in Adelaide
January 2006 sports events in Australia